Water Margin, or Shui Hu Zhuan, is a classic Chinese novel by Shi Nai'an. Alternative titles include Outlaws of the Marsh, All Men Are Brothers, Men of the Marshes, and The Marshes of Mount Liang.

Shui Hu Zhuan or any title with the Chinese characters 水滸 or 水浒 may also refer to:
The Water Margin (film), a 1972 Hong Kong film
The Water Margin (1973 TV series), a 1973 Japanese TV series, shown in English from 1976 to 1978
All Men Are Brothers (film), a 1975 Hong Kong wuxia film
Outlaws of the Marsh (TV series), a 1983-1986 Chinese TV series
The Water Margin (1998 TV series), a 1998 Chinese TV series
Shades of Truth, a 2004 / 2005 Hong Kong TV series
All Men Are Brothers (TV series), a 2011 Chinese TV series
Suikoden, a Japanese RPG

Water Margin